Rogów  is a village in Brzeziny County, Łódź Voivodeship, in central Poland. It is the seat of the gmina (administrative district) called Gmina Rogów.

The village has a population of 1,500.

References

Villages in Brzeziny County